The selection process for the 1998 Winter Olympics consisted of five bids, and saw Nagano, Japan, be selected ahead of Salt Lake City, Utah, United States; Östersund, Sweden; Jaca, Spain; and Aosta, Italy. The selection was made at the 97th IOC Session in Birmingham, United Kingdom, on 15 June 1991.

The Nagano Olympic bid committee spent approximately $14 million to entertain the 62 International Olympic Committee members and many of their companions. The precise figures are unknown since Nagano, after the IOC asked that the entertainment expenditures not be made public, destroyed the financial records, according to bid committee member Junichi Yamaguchi.

Results

References

Bids
 
June 1991 sports events in Europe
1991 in England
Events in Birmingham, West Midlands
1990s in Birmingham, West Midlands